The 1980 Canadian federal election was held on February 18, 1980, to elect members of the House of Commons of Canada of the 32nd Parliament of Canada. It was called when the minority Progressive Conservative government led by Prime Minister Joe Clark was defeated in the Commons.

Clark and his government had been under attack for its perceived inexperience, for example, in its handling of its 1979 election campaign commitment to move Canada's embassy in Israel from Tel Aviv to Jerusalem.  Clark had maintained uneasy relations with the fourth largest party in the House of Commons, Social Credit. While he needed the six votes that the conservative-populist Quebec-based party had to get legislation passed, he was unwilling to agree to the conditions they imposed for their support. Clark had managed to recruit one Social Credit MP, Richard Janelle, to join the PC caucus.

Clark's Minister of Finance, John Crosbie, introduced an austere government budget in late 1979 that proposed to increase the excise tax on gasoline by 18¢ per Imperial gallon (about 4¢ a litre) to reduce the federal government's deficit. The New Democratic Party's finance critic, Bob Rae, proposed a subamendment to the budget motion, stating that the House of Commons did not approve of the budget. The five remaining Social Credit MPs abstained, upset that the revenues from the increased gas tax were not allocated to Quebec. In addition, one Tory MP (Alvin Hamilton) was too ill to attend the vote while two others (Flora MacDonald and Lloyd Crouse) were abroad on official business. Meanwhile, the Liberals assembled all but one member of their caucus (Serge Joyal), even going as far as to take two MPs out of the hospital (Maurice Dionne and Claude Lajoie) for the vote. Rae's subamendment was adopted by a vote of 139–133, bringing down the government and forcing a new election.

Former Liberal Prime Minister Pierre Trudeau had announced his resignation as leader of the Liberal Party following its defeat in 1979. However, no leadership convention had been held when the Progressive Conservative government fell. Trudeau quickly rescinded his resignation and led the party to victory, winning 33 more seats than in the 1979 federal election. That enabled the Liberals to form a majority government.

Clark's Tories campaigned under the slogan, "Real change deserves a fair chance," but the voters were unwilling to give Clark another chance. The loss of the budget vote just seven months into his mandate and his subsequent defeat in the February 18 general election would eventually result in his ouster as leader by Brian Mulroney in 1983.

The Socreds' abstention on the crucial budget vote, even if not decisive (the vote would still have passed by 139-138 had they opposed it), contributed to the growing perception that the party had become irrelevant since the death of iconic leader Réal Caouette. The party lost more than three-fifths of its vote share, and while four of its incumbents still managed to each post respectable second-place finishes, none were re-elected. Having lost its presence in Parliament, Social Credit rapidly declined into obscurity and would never be a serious contender to win seats again, although the party nominally continued to exist until 1993.

The new House was very regionally polarized. While the Liberals were shut out west of Manitoba, they were able to win by piling up massive majorities in the two most populous provinces. The Tories won only one seat out of 75 in Quebec while winning 43 percent of the seats in the 4 atlantic provinces.

The voter turnout was 69.3%.

National results

Notes:

"% change" refers to change from previous election.

Changes to party standings from previous election: Social Credit MP Richard Janelle crossed the floor to join the PC Party. PC MP John Diefenbaker died during the parliamentary session. A New Democrat was elected in the subsequent by-election.

Vote and seat summaries

Results by province and territory

xx - less than 0.05% of the popular vote.

Notes

 Number of parties: 9
 First appearance: none
 Final appearance: Union populaire
 Final appearance before hiatus: Marxist–Leninist Party of Canada (returned in 1993)

See also
 
List of Canadian federal general elections
List of political parties in Canada
33rd Canadian Parliament
Articles on parties' candidates in this election:
 Independent
 Liberal
 Libertarian
 New Democrats
 Progressive Conservative
 Rhinoceros

References

Further reading

External links
Riding map
The Elections of 1979 and 1980, by Robert Bothwell

 
Federal election
Federal election